Finn and Hattie is a 1931 American comedic pre-Code film directed by Norman Taurog, starring Leon Errol, Mitzi Green and ZaSu Pitts.

References

External links

1931 films
Films directed by Norman Taurog
1930s English-language films
American black-and-white films
1931 comedy films
American comedy films
1930s American films